Holan is a small village in the municipality of Oppdal in Sør-Trøndelag county, Norway. It is located along the European route E6 highway and along the river Driva at the northern end of the Drivdalen valley.

References

Villages in Trøndelag
Oppdal